The Palliser's Cottage Home No. 35 is a Stick Style house at 2314 West 111th Place in the Morgan Park neighborhood of Chicago, Illinois, United States.  Plans for the house appeared in the pattern book of Palliser, Palliser & Co. in 1878  and this house was built in 1882 for Rev. Johan Edgren. It was designated a Chicago Landmark on February 16, 2000.

References

Houses completed in 1882
Houses in Chicago
Chicago Landmarks
South Side, Chicago